The River Isla may refer to:

River Isla, Moray, a tributary of the River Deveron in Scotland
River Isla, Perthshire, a tributary of the River Tay in Scotland